Mara can be either a surname or a (usually female) first name.
As a surname, it may be:
Irish: a shortened form of O’Mara;
Hungarian: from a pet form of the personal names Mária, Márkus (Hungarian form of Marcus or Mark) or Márton (Hungarian form of Martin), or from a short form of the old ecclesiastical name Marcel;
Czech (Mára): from a pet form of the personal name Marek or Martin.

Mara as a female first name is pronounced MAHR-ah most of the time, but can be pronounced as rhyming with Sarah in Jewish-American and Southern United States culture. It is of Hebrew origin, and the meaning of Mara is "bitter", which carries the implication "strength". The biblical Naomi, mother-in-law of Ruth, claimed the name Mara (מרא) as an expression of grief after the deaths of her husband and sons. It also means "Lady" in Aramaic, because Mar means "Lord", and is a title of bishops in the Syriac Christian church. It is also the name of a bitter lake in the Bible, and a title of the Kabbalistic sephira Binah. Mara means joy in Arabic and can be a unisex name. (Ar:مرح),in ancient Egypt it meant "The truth of God Ra" Ma for Truth ('Ma-at') and Ra the God of the Sun.

The name may also be a Spanish, Italian, Portuguese, Greek or East European variant of Mary, Marianna, Maria, Marzanna and as a short form of Tamara. It is a variant of Maura, an Anglicization of the Irish name Máire, the Irish name of Mary, or the Scottish name Moira. It can also be a feminine version of Mauro, meaning a dark-skinned person. In Hindu, and Southeast Asian Buddhist cultures, it is etymologically related to the Sanskrit terms Mala (rosary), Mallika (jasmine) or Mayura (peacock) and is a unisex name or a surname, etymologically unrelated to anything demonic in Sino-Tibetan and modern Indic languages because the letters R and L are sometimes conflated (cf. in Japanese). It is a popular name in Latin America and the United States, for it has been in the top 1000 in the United States since 1950.

People with the surname
Adele Mara (1923–2010), American actress
Alehana Mara (born 1989), New Zealand rugby league footballer
Audrey Crespo-Mara (born 1976), French journalist and television presenter
Bob Mara (1940–2014), Australian rugby league footballer
Bogdan Mara (born 1977), Romanian footballer
Celia Mara (born 1961), Brazilian singer-songwriter and producer
David Mara (or Mari; born 1995), Australian bobsledder
Dan Mara (born c. 1955), American college basketball coach
Elidion Mara (born 1997), Albanian footballer
Finau Mara (born 1960), Fijian lawyer, politician, and diplomat
Gary Mara (1962–2012), Australian rugby league footballer; son of Bob
George Mara (1921–2006), Canadian businessman and Olympian hockey player
Gertrud Elisabeth Mara (1749–1833), German operatic soprano
Ignác František Mara (1709–1783), Bohemian cellist and composer 
Jack Mara (1908–1965), American co-owner of the New York Giants
Jason O'Mara (born 1972), Irish-American actor
John Mara (born 1954), American New York Giants executive
John Andrew Mara (1840–1920), Canadian politician, rancher and merchant
Kamisese Mara (1920–2004), Fijian politician
Kate Mara (born 1983), American actress
Lala Mara (1931–2004), Fijian chief
Lya Mara (1897–1960), German actress of the silent era
Mary Mara (1960–2022), American TV and film actress
Michele Mara (1903–1983), Italian cyclist
Mohamed Mara (born 1996), Guinean international footballer
Moussa Mara (born 1975), Malian politician and Prime Minister of Mali from 2014 to 2015
Nick Mara (born 1997), American singer of boy band Prettymuch
Patrick Mara (born 1975), American elected member of the District of Columbia Board of Education
Paul Mara (born 1979), American ice hockey player
Peter Mara (born 1947), Canadian ice hockey player
P. J. Mara (1942–2016), Irish public affairs consultant
Peter O'Mara (born 1957), Australian-born jazz guitarist, composer and teacher
Rebecca O'Mara (born 1977), Irish actress
Rooney Mara (born 1985), American actress
Sékou Mara (born 2002), French footballer
Sri Mara (137–192 AD), Chinese founder of the kingdom of Champa
Tânia Mara (born 1983), Brazilian singer and actress
Tevita Mara (fl. 1980s–2010s), Fijian career soldier
Thalia Mara (1911–2003), American ballet dancer and educator 
Tim Mara (1887–1959), American New York Giants executive
Timothy J. Mara (1935–1995), American businessman and part owner of the New York Giants football team
Uerdi Mara (born 1999), Albanian footballer
Václav Mára (born 1943), Czechoslovak sprint canoer
Wellington Mara (1916–2005), American New York Giants executive
Ann Mara (1929–2015), American businesswoman, philanthropist, wife and widow of Wellington Mara
Wil Mara (born 1966), American writer and novelist

People with the given name
Mara Abbott (born 1985), American cyclist
Mara Bar-Serapion, 1st-century Syriac writer
Mara Bergman (fl. 1980s–2010s), American author
Mara Bizzotto, Italian politician
Mara Branković, medieval Serbian royal
Mara Brock Akil, American television producer
Mara Brunetti, Italian swimmer
Mara Buneva, Bulgarian revolutionary
Mara Carfagna (born 1975), Italian politician
Mara Carlyle, English singer-songwriter
Mara Corday, American model
Mara Croatto, Puerto Rican actress
Mara Darmousli, Greek fashion model
Mara Galeazzi, Italian ballet dancer
Mara Hvistendahl, American Pulitzer Prize-winning journalist for Seed magazine
Mara Liasson (born 1955), American political correspondent
Mara Lopez (born 1991), Filipina surfer
Mara Navarria, Italian fencer
Mara Prada (fl. 2010s), Columbia singer on "Crazy Love" with Beto Pérez
Mara Rosolen (born 1965), Italian shot putter
Mara Santangelo (born 1981), Italian tennis player
Mara Sapon-Shevin, American professor of inclusive education
Mara Schiavocampo, American journalist
Mara Schnittka (born 1995), known professionally as Julia Montes, Filipino actress of German descent
Mara Švel-Gamiršek, Croatian writer
Mara Torres (born 1974), Spanish journalist
Mara Wilson (born 1987), American actress and writer

Fictional characters
 Marller ("Mara"), a demon in the manga and anime series Oh My Goddess!
 Mara Jade, in the Star Wars Expanded Universe
 Mara David, in the Filipino soap opera Mara Clara
 Mara Aramov, the antagonist of the Syphon Filter video game series
 Mara Jaffray, in TV series House of Anubis
 Mara Lady of the Acoma, in the Empire Trilogy novels by Raymond E. Feist and Janny Wurts
 Mara, the mother-goddess in the pantheon of The Elder Scrolls
 Mara Sov, the queen of the awoken people in Destiny 1 and 2
 Mara, a past She-Ra from DreamWorks' TV series She-Ra and the Princesses of Power
 Mara Amaratayakul, main character of the Thai television anthology series Girl from Nowhere
 Mara, an old and wise gypsy woman in the book Mond, Mond, Mond by Ursula Wölfel
 Mara, character from Shimmer and Shine

Nicknames
Nickname of Martti Ahtisaari, a career diplomat and former President of Finland 
Nickname for Maria in Bulgarian, Croatian, Hungarian and Serbian 
Nickname for Dagmar in Scandinavian languages and Czech
Nickname for Martin or Martina in Hungarian
Nickname for Tamara
Nickname for Meredith when pronounced like Meh-ra 
Nickname for Maranatha in Evangelical Christian culture 
Nickname for Maria, Marianna, et al. in Russian and other Slavic languages
Nickname for such names as Marcel, Markus or Martin
Naomi (Bible), self-named Mara, meaning "bitterness", after she suffered the deaths of her husband and her two sons
Stage name for Faith Coloccia during her solo performances

References

See also
Māra (given name)
Mara (disambiguation)
Maura (disambiguation)
Máire
Marah (disambiguation)
Moira (given name)
Maria (disambiguation)

English feminine given names
Romanian feminine given names

it:Mara